David John Andreychuk (born September 29, 1963) is a Canadian former professional ice hockey left winger who played in the NHL with the Buffalo Sabres, Toronto Maple Leafs, New Jersey Devils, Boston Bruins, Colorado Avalanche and Tampa Bay Lightning. He is one of the highest scoring left wingers in NHL history, and, with 274, is in second place of the league's all-time leaders in power-play goals behind Alexander Ovechkin. He was inducted into the Hockey Hall of Fame in 2017.

Playing career
Dave Andreychuk was drafted by the Buffalo Sabres from the Ontario Hockey League's Oshawa Generals in the 1982 NHL Entry Draft and played his first NHL season in 1982–83. He went on to play 11 seasons in Buffalo before being traded on February 2, 1993, with Daren Puppa, and a 1993 first-round pick (Kenny Jönsson) to the Toronto Maple Leafs in exchange for Grant Fuhr and a conditional 1995 fifth-round draft pick. He played for the Leafs until 1995–96 when he was traded to the New Jersey Devils, where he stayed until 1999. After New Jersey, he had short stints with the Boston Bruins (1999–2000), Colorado Avalanche (2000), and Buffalo Sabres (2000–01), before settling with the Tampa Bay Lightning (2001–02 to 2005–06).

His best season offensively was in 1993–94 when, with Toronto, he posted 53 goals and 99 points. The 1993 and 1994 playoffs also saw Andreychuk and the Maple Leafs advance to the Conference Finals, where they lost to the Los Angeles Kings and the Vancouver Canucks, respectively.  As a result of his successful stint with the team, many Maple Leafs' fans still affectionately refer to him simply as "Uncle Dave". Andreychuk referred to the famed 1993 run in particular as particularly heartbreaking, as Toronto was eliminated in game seven negating the chance of a Toronto-Montreal Stanley Cup Final in the league's 75th anniversary season.

As a member of the Boston Bruins on October 28, 1999, Andreychuk had a four-goal game versus Tampa Bay.

In the 2001–02 NHL season, Andreychuk made a shocking move which would pay dividends in the long run. Rather than sign with a Stanley Cup contender, he signed with the lowly Tampa Bay Lightning, to which he was able to bring some much-needed veteran leadership. The Lightning again missed the playoffs that season, and Andreychuk refused trades to contenders, stating his work with the team was not finished. In 2002–03, Lightning head coach John Tortorella appointed Andreychuk the captain, (succeeding Vincent Lecavalier, who was stripped of the captaincy after the 2000–01 season) and Andreychuk promptly led the Lightning to the playoffs for the first time in seven seasons.

In the 2003–04 NHL season, Andreychuk continued as a key contributor for the Lightning offence, reaching 20 goals for the third consecutive year with the team. Qualifying for the playoffs for a second consecutive year, Andreychuk helped the Lightning defeat the Calgary Flames in seven games to win the Stanley Cup for the first time in franchise history. Andreychuk went 22 years without being on a Stanley Cup championship team, tying the NHL record with Ray Bourque for the longest career before doing so (Andreychuk had played 1597 regular-season games to that point, and only Bourque had played more career games before being on his first Stanley Cup-winning team).

Following the 2004–05 NHL lockout, Andreychuk returned to the Lightning for the 2005–06 season. After the year off, Andreychuk's contributions decreased and on January 10, 2006, he was waived by the Lightning, bringing an end to his career.

Post-retirement

On October 1, 2006, Andreychuk rejoined the Lightning as a Community Representative.

In 2005, the city of Hamilton renamed the Mountain Arena, following renovations, the Dave Andreychuk Mountain Arena & Skating Centre in his honour. On November 28, 2008, he was inducted into the Buffalo Sabres Hall of Fame.

On February 4, 2011, the Tampa Bay Lightning named Andreychuk as their Vice President in charge of fans. He currently serves as the Lightning's Vice President of Corporate & Community Affairs.

Personal life 
Andreychuk married his wife Sue in 1991 and together they have three daughters, Taylor, Caci and Brooke. The family resides in Tampa, Florida. Prior to his appointment in the Lightning's front office, Andreychuk and his family resided in East Amherst, New York.

Following his retirement from professional sport, Andreychuk also founded the Dave Andreychuk Foundation as a way of giving back to the community.  The foundation has two branches, a Canadian one in Andreychuk's home town of Hamilton, Ontario, and a U.S. one in Tampa, Florida where he currently lives.  The goals of the foundation are three-fold:  1. Assist children in need, 2. Support causes for children and families enduring chronic and/or life-threatening illness, and 3. Encourage the investment of youth and amateur sports.

Records and achievements
 Seventh most games played in NHL history with 1639.
 15th most goals scored in NHL history with 640.
 Tied with Denis Savard for 28th in league history with 1,338 points.
 Second most NHL career power-play goals with 274.
 1991–92 NHL power-play goals leader with 28.
 1992–93 NHL power-play goals leader with 32.
 Played in NHL All-Star Game in 1990 and 1994.
Stanley Cup champion  —  2004
 Inducted into the Hockey Hall of Fame in 2017.

Career statistics

Regular season and playoffs

International

See also
 List of NHL statistical leaders
 List of NHL players with 1,000 points
 List of NHL players with 500 goals
 List of NHL players with 1,000 games played

References

External links

Hockeydraftcentral.com

1963 births
Living people
Boston Bruins players
Buffalo Sabres draft picks
Buffalo Sabres players
Canadian expatriate ice hockey players in the United States
Canadian ice hockey left wingers
Canadian people of Ukrainian descent
Colorado Avalanche players
Hockey Hall of Fame inductees
Ice hockey people from Ontario
National Hockey League All-Stars
National Hockey League first-round draft picks
New Jersey Devils players
Oshawa Generals players
Sportspeople from Hamilton, Ontario
Stanley Cup champions
Tampa Bay Lightning announcers
Tampa Bay Lightning players
Toronto Maple Leafs players